The 2012 Yangzhou earthquake occurred in Jiangsu Province of the People's Republic of China at 20:11 (UTC+8) in Yangzhou on July 20.

Location
The epicenter was located at the boundary of Baoying County and Gaoyou City, both of which under the jurisdiction of Yangzhou. The earthquake could be felt in a number of nearby cities including Changzhou, Xuzhou, Zhenjiang and Nanjing, the capital of Jiangsu Province.

Damage
The quake measured 4.9 on the body wave magnitude scale. According to official sources, one person died and two were injured as a result of the earthquake. Thirteen rooms collapsed and 155 rooms were severely damaged.

References

External links
 M4.9 - Jiangsu, China – United States Geological Survey

Yangzhou Earthquake
2012 disasters in China
Earthquakes in China
History of Jiangsu
July 2012 events in China